The Pan-Armenian National Movement or Armenian All-national Movement (HHS) was a political party in Armenia.

History
The party emerged from the resolution of the Nagorno-Karabakh Autonomous Council of 20 February 1988, to reunite with Soviet Armenia. Its first meetings, which demanded reunification of Nagorno-Karabakh with Armenia, were held in Yerevan on 21 February 1988. Its ruling committee led by Igor Muradyan was organized in the same month, and Levon Ter-Petrossian was incorporated into the ruling body in May 1988. On 15 June 1988, with representation of the movement in the Supreme Council, this body adopted a resolution on reunification of the two national units. PANM participated in the 1990 Armenian Supreme Soviet elections, gaining 59 seats in Parliament.

The party nominated Ter-Petrossian as their candidate in the 1991 Armenian presidential election. Ter-Petrossian won the election, securing 83% of the vote. The party once again nominated Ter-Petrossian as their candidate in the 1996 Armenian presidential election, he won with 51.3% of the vote. The party eventually lost significance when Ter-Petrossian resigned as president in 1998. The party lost all its representation in the National Assembly following the 1999 Armenian parliamentary election, losing 62 seats.

Since 2010, the party had been a member of the Alliance of Liberals and Democrats for Europe Party (ALDE Party).

The party participated in the 2012 Armenian parliamentary election and won just one seat in the National Assembly.

Activities
In July 2012, the party participated in a forum of liberal parties from the Caucasus region. The forum included the Republican Party of Georgia and the Musavat party. Issues of joint regional cooperation, as well as, issues of integration into European structures was discussed.

Dissolution and successor parties
The Pan-Armenian National Movement was last led by Aram Manukyan and the party officially dissolved in 2013.

The Pan-Armenian National Movement spearheaded the formation of Armenian National Congress, a diverse coalition of several Armenian opposition parties, headed by Levon Ter-Petrossian in opposition to the ruling governmental coalition headed by former Armenian President Serzh Sargsyan. 

The Armenian National Movement Party (ANM) also traces its early history to the Pan-Armenian National Movement, with Ararat Zurabyan currently leading the ANM.

See also
 Karabakh Committee
 Programs of political parties in Armenia

References

External links
 Pan-Armenian National Movement Official website

1988 establishments in the Soviet Union
2013 disestablishments in Armenia
Alliance of Liberals and Democrats for Europe Party member parties
Anti-communist parties
Defunct political parties in Armenia
Nationalist parties in Armenia
Political parties disestablished in 2013
Political parties established in 1988
Pro-independence parties in the Soviet Union
Liberal parties in Armenia